The A588 is a road in England which runs from Poulton-le-Fylde to Lancaster in Lancashire. It is the main route serving the Over Wyre areas of the Fylde.

It meets the A585 eastbound at the River Wyre roundabout. From here the road winds through the Over-Wyre villages of Hambleton, Stalmine and Pilling and across the marshy land that abuts the Cockerham Sands portion of Morecambe Bay.

See also
Conder Bridge

Roads in Lancashire
A588 road